Newham Collegiate Sixth Form Centre, also known as The NCS, is a free school sixth form college located in East Ham, London, England. Administered by the City of London Academies Trust, it was opened in 2014. The college is coeducational and is affiliated with University College London  who is a strategic partner. It is rated “Outstanding” by Ofsted. It has an ALPS 1 score for value added.

Curriculum 
The NCS specialises in the teaching of Maths and the Sciences, and contains nine labs that are equipped to a high standard for studying the Sciences (Biology, Chemistry and Physics). The centre offers the following A Level courses:
Biology, Chemistry, Economics, English Literature, Further Maths, Geography, Government and Politics, History, Maths, Physics, Psychology and Religious Studies.  They also provide a super curriculum to extend knowledge beyond the A Level syllabus and introduce students to topics they might not otherwise be engaged with.

Campus
The college is located in a Grade II listed former council building. Surrounding their buildings on the same campus is East Ham Leisure Centre and Library.

Specialist Support 
The NCS provides specialist support in the sectors of Medicine, Law, Finance and Engineering.

Partnerships and programmes
Working with Newham Council, the NCS is the academic A Level centre of a group of partner secondary schools in the borough. These schools are Cumberland, Kingsford, Lister, Little Ilford, Plashet, Rokeby, Royal Docks, Sarah Bonnell and Stratford School Academy.

On 12 November 2014 UCL announced a strategic partnership with Newham Collegiate Sixth Form Centre. The partnership aligns with the aims of UCL 2034, reflecting UCL’s commitment to being a publicly engaged institution with an interest in the education of London students.

Guest speakers have included Natalie Bennett, Owen Jones, Ed Miliband, Sir Win Bischoff, Gina Miller, Dr Aziz Aboobaker, Annabel Port, Stephen Timms MP, Dr Kenneth Tong, Dr George McGavin, Simon Singh, Shami Chakrabarti, Lord Mervyn King, Robert Winston, Ed Miliband, Venki Ramakrishnan, Evan Davis and Sir Robin Wales.

References

2014 establishments in England
Education in the London Borough of Newham
Educational institutions established in 2014
Free schools in London
Grade II listed buildings in the London Borough of Newham